Scopwick is a small village and civil parish in the district of North Kesteven, Lincolnshire, England, situated   south from Lincoln. The population of the civil parish at the 2011 census was  815. The parish includes Kirkby Green, a hamlet to the east of Scopwick. The village main road runs parallel to a narrow stream.

The name Scopwick comes from old English. Scaep was an old word for sheep and wick meant farm.

The village cemetery includes a War Graves site for airmen from RAF Coleby Grange and RAF Digby (originally RAF Scopwick), and includes that of the young Second World War poet and aviator John Gillespie Magee.

Part of the brick tower of Scopwick Tower Mill, which was built in 1827 and fell into disuse around 1912, remains standing.

History 

Bronze Age burials and barrows have been found in Scopwick. There is evidence of a Roman settlement (coins, pottery, burials and a dwelling). A Saxon coin found in the village depicts Offa and has been dated to 757–796 AD.

The village is mentioned in the 1066 Domesday Book as Scapeuic/Scapewic.

Geography and ecology

A limestone stream runs through the village toward Kirkby Green and terminates near the railway. Wildlife on the stream includes moorhen, mallard, water mint and hart's tongue fern. Around Scopwick Hall there is a small deciduous woodland. To the northwest of the village is a quarry.

References

External links

Scopwick Village website
Scopwick Tower Mill
John Gillespie Magee's grave
Whites 1842 Lincolnshire entry for Scopwick

Villages in Lincolnshire
Civil parishes in Lincolnshire
North Kesteven District